San Giuseppe a Chiaia is a church in Naples, Italy. Founded as a chapel for the Jesuit Order; it was enlarged during 1666-1673 under designs by Tommaso Carrere.

 
With the suppression of the Jesuit Order, the church changed management. About 1817, under the patronage of Ferdinando I it became a hospice for the blind called the Casa di San Giuseppe e Lucia.

The interior has a paintings of St Ignatius of Loyola by Luca Giordano, Family of the Virgin by Nicola Malinconico, a St Anne and Holy Family by Francesco di Maria.

See also
 List of Jesuit sites

Bibliography
Derived from Napoli e dintorni, Touring club Italia, Touring Editore, 2001. as quoted in Italian Wikipedia entry.

Roman Catholic churches in Naples
Baroque architecture in Naples
17th-century Roman Catholic church buildings in Italy